Dennis Nelson may refer to:

 Dennis Nelson (American football) (born 1946), former American football player
 Dennis Nelson (footballer) (born 1950), Scottish former footballer